Ernst Stavro Blofeld is a villain in the James Bond series of novels and films. The name may also refer to:

 Henry Blofeld (born 1939), British sports journalist
 John Blofeld (1913–1987), British writer on Asian thought and religion
 John Blofeld (judge) (born 1932), English barrister and former High Court judge
 Nick Blofeld (born 1963), English sports businessman
 Tom Blofeld (born 1964), writer, owner and CEO of Bewilderwood, an adventure park in Norfolk, England
 Waldorf Blofeld, synthesizer manufactured by Waldorf Music

See also
 Blofield
 Blomfield (disambiguation)
 Bloomfield (disambiguation)